Pinnacle Hill is situated in the range of Malvern Hills in England, running about  north-south along the Herefordshire-Worcestershire border.
It is the site of two possible Bronze Age round barrows.

References

Further reading

External links
Colwall round barrows at PastScape
Pinnacle Hill Walk

Marilyns of England
Hills of Worcestershire
Malvern Hills
Bronze Age sites in Herefordshire